The Conanicut Friends Meetinghouse is a historic Quaker meeting house at the junction of North Road and Weeden Lane in Jamestown, Rhode Island.

The structure was built in 1786 to replace the original meeting house destroyed by the British after they occupied Conanicut Island in 1776. The building was added to the National Register of Historic Places in 1973, and is included in the Windmill Hill Historic District. It is still used for religious services during the summer. It contains the Old Friends' Burial Ground.

See also
National Register of Historic Places listings in Newport County, Rhode Island

References

External links
Listing and photographs of the Burial Ground at the Historic American Buildings Survey

Quaker meeting houses in Rhode Island
Churches on the National Register of Historic Places in Rhode Island
Churches completed in 1786
Buildings and structures in Jamestown, Rhode Island
Churches in Newport County, Rhode Island
18th-century Quaker meeting houses
National Register of Historic Places in Newport County, Rhode Island
Cemeteries in Rhode Island